Dominic John Rebelo (born August 14, 1978) is an athlete from Kenya, who competes in archery. He competed at the 1996 and 2000 Summer Olympics.

2000 Summer Olympics
At the 2000 Summer Olympics in Sydney Rebelo finished his ranking round with a total of 500 points, which gave him the 63rd seed for the final competition bracket in which he faced Oh Kyo-Moon in the first round. Kyo-Moon won the match by 168-132 and Rebelo was eliminated from the competition.

References 

1978 births
Living people
Kenyan male archers
Archers at the 1996 Summer Olympics
Archers at the 2000 Summer Olympics
Olympic archers of Kenya